Ralph Assheton (1830–1907) was an English politician.

Biography

Early life
Ralph Assheton was born on 20 December 1830. His father was William Assheton (1788–1853) and his mother, Hon. Frances Annabella Cokayne (1795–1835). His maternal great-grandfather was Charles Cokayne, 5th Viscount Cullen (1710–1802). He graduated from Trinity College, Cambridge, where he received a Masters of Arts degree.

Career
He was elected as Member of Parliament for Clitheroe at an unopposed by-election in 1868 following the death of Richard Fort. He held the seat at the subsequent 1868 general election, and also in 1874, but was defeated at the 1880 general election. He did not stand for Parliament again.

Personal life
He married Emily Augusta Feilden, sister of Joseph Feilden (1824–1895) and daughter of Joseph Feilden and Frances Mary Master, on 3 August 1854. They had seven children:
Frances Annabella Assheton (died 1939).
Dorothy Assheton (died 1908).
Joan Assheton (died 1962).
Sir Ralph Cockayne Assheton, 1st Bt (1860–1945).
Richard Assheton (1863–1915).
Reverend William Orme Assheton (1866–1953).
Nicholas Radclyffe Assheton (1870–1960).

They resided at Downham Hall in Downham, Lancashire. He died on 22 June 1907.

References

External links

1830 births
1907 deaths
Alumni of Trinity College, Cambridge
Conservative Party (UK) MPs for English constituencies
UK MPs 1865–1868
UK MPs 1868–1874
UK MPs 1874–1880